Live from Austin, TX is an album by Waylon Jennings, released on New West Records in 2006. As part of New West's series of albums featuring individual artists' performances on Austin City Limits, it was recorded on April 1, 1989, several months after the release of Full Circle, Jennings' last album for MCA Records, and a year before the singer's move to Epic Records would yield The Eagle. The songs themselves primarily include popular selections from Jennings' own catalog: "I'm a Ramblin' Man", "America", "Theme from The Dukes of Hazzard (Good Ol' Boys)", "Luckenbach, Texas (Back to the Basics of Love)" and "Mamas Don't Let Your Babies Grow Up to Be Cowboys", among others.  The concert was also released in video format and in 2007, the DVD of Live from Austin, TX was certified gold by the RIAA.

Track listing
"I'm a Ramblin' Man" (Ray Pennington)
"Rainy Day Woman" (Jennings)
"America" (Sammy Johns)
"I May Be Used (But Baby I Ain't Used Up)" (Bob McDill)
"Amanda" (McDill)
"Me and Bobby McGee" (Kris Kristofferson)
"Trouble Man" (Jennings, Tony Joe White)
"Mammas Don't Let Your Babies Grow Up to Be Cowboys" (Ed Bruce, Patsy Bruce)
"Good Ol' Boys" (Jennings)
"Bob Wills Is Still the King" (Jennings)
"Are You Sure Hank Done It This Way" (Jennings)
"Suspicious Minds" (Mark James)
"Honky Tonk Angels" (Edward Miller, Patsy Miller)
"Good Hearted Woman" (Jennings, Willie Nelson)
"I've Always Been Crazy" (Jennings)
"Luckenbach, Texas (Back to the Basics of Love)" (Bobby Emmons, Chips Moman)
"I Ain't Living Long Like This" (Rodney Crowell)

References

Waylon Jennings albums
Live albums published posthumously
2006 live albums
2006 video albums
Live video albums
New West Records live albums
New West Records video albums
Video albums published posthumously
Austin City Limits